Ikjan is a former town near the present-day town of Beni Aziz in Algeria. Between 902 and 909 it served as the base and capital of the Kutama Berbers led by the dā'ī (missionary) Abu Abdallah al-Shi'i, who had founded an Isma'ili Shi'a state in the region on behalf of the Fatimid cause. This new movement rose in opposition to the Aghlabid dynasty, which ruled the region of Ifriqiya formally on behalf of the Abbasid Caliphs. The site of Ikjan was considered impregnable. In 909 Abu Abdallah and the Kutama armies finally overthrew the Aghlabids and set themselves up in Raqqada, laying the foundations for the Fatimid Caliphate, which was formally established with the enthronement of the first caliph, Abd Allah al-Mahdi, later that year.

References 

Former populated places in Algeria